(George) Adrian Horridge FRS FAA (born 12 December 1927) is an Australian neurobiologist and professor at Australian National University.

Life
Horridge was born in Sheffield, England, to George William Horridge (1897-1981) and Olive (1899-1995), daughter of Albert Stray, who owned a chain of sweetshops. The Horridge family had operated a business in Sheffield- William Horridge and Company, "Stag, Buck, Horn, Wood and Buffalo Handles, and Scale Cutters"- since 1750, producing amongst other things ivory scales for piano keys, combs, and knife handles. His paternal grandfather was the last to be involved with the company, which was sold in 1921 for £15,000 ("when you could buy a house for £100"); after World War I, Horridge's father started a motorbike repair and sale business in his back yard, which expanded until he and a business partner were substantial motorcycle agents with a showroom and repair shops.

He attended King Edward VII School. He obtained a scholarship to St John's College, Cambridge in 1946. 
He earned a PhD from the University of Cambridge and was appointed to a Fellowship in Chemistry at St. John's in 1953.  From 1960 till 1969 he was Director of the Gatty Marine Laboratory at the University of St Andrews.
From 1969 till 1993 he was a professor at the  Research School of Biological Sciences at the Australian National University, and subsequently Emeritus Professor. He lives in Yarralumla, Canberra.

In 2001 he was awarded a Centenary Medal "for service to Australian society in the biological sciences".

Horridge was married for 59 years to Audrey (1930-2013), daughter of Rev. Harcourt Robert Henry Lightburne, vicar of St Mary's, Upchurch, Kent. She was a Girton College, Cambridge and Barnett House, Oxford graduate responsible for the Service for Overseas Students- coordinating over 30,000 nationwide- with the Australian Development Agency, and formerly a social planner with the National Capital Development Commission. Horridge has a son and four daughters.

Works

References

External links
 Interview with the Australian Academy of Science

1927 births
Australian neuroscientists
Fellows of the Royal Society
People educated at King Edward VII School, Sheffield
Academic staff of the Australian National University
Alumni of St John's College, Cambridge
Academics of the University of St Andrews
Living people
Fellows of the Australian Academy of Science
British emigrants to Australia